The 1942 Rhode Island Rams football team was an American football team that represented Rhode Island State College (later renamed the University of Rhode Island) as a member of the New England Conference during the 1942 college football season. In its first season under head coach Paul Cieurzo, the team compiled a 3–3 record (0–2 against conference opponents) and tied for last place in the conference. The team played its home games at Meade Stadium in Kingston, Rhode Island.

Schedule

References

Rhode Island State
Rhode Island Rams football seasons
Rhode Island State Rams football